Chueh may refer to:

Wei Chueh (1928–2016), Chinese Buddhist monk in Taiwan
Min Chueh Chang  (1908–1991), Chinese American reproductive biologist
Luke Chueh (born 1973), artist in lowbrow or pop surrealism art movement
Chueh Ming-hui (born 1984), Taiwanese softball player
T'u-chüeh; see Göktürks

See also
Jue (disambiguation)